Heinrich Kleinschroth and Friedrich Rahe defeated Alfred Beamish and James Cecil Parke 6–3, 6–2, 6–4 in the All Comers' Final, but the reigning champions Herbert Roper Barrett and Charles Dixon defeated Kleinschroth and Rahe 6–2, 6–4, 4–6, 6–2 in the challenge round to win the gentlemen's doubles tennis title at the 1913 Wimbledon Championships.

Draw

Challenge round

All comers' finals

Top half

Section 1

Section 2

Bottom half

Section 3

Section 4

References

External links

Men's Doubles
Wimbledon Championship by year – Men's doubles